Roadies: Real Heroes was the sixteenth season of the Indian reality show MTV Roadies, which premiered on MTV on 10 February 2019. Returning Gang Leaders Prince Narula, Nikhil Chinapa, Neha Dhupia and Raftaar were joined by new arrival Sandeep Singh. Rannvijay Singha continued to serve as a mentor and host, while Divya Agarwal and Varun Sood played the role of Roadies Insiders. Baseer Ali hosted the Voot segments with Shruti Sinha.

Auditions  Episode 1 to 7 
The contestants had to get at least four votes from the Gang Leaders, while Rannvijay had a "special power" that could send a selected contestant straight to the journey. He also had the right to a vote and had two votes, if he wanted the contestant to proceed to the next round.

 Male
 Female

Real Heroes 
This season, a few contestants were already chosen to be on the journey called the Real Heroes.

 Male
 Female

Culling  Episode 8 

Direct Entries
Real Heroes : Milind, 
Bidhan and Bhargsethu. Watt : Nikitta, Aadil and Rachel.

Total: 25
Male = 13
Female = 12

Battleground 

Battleground was an online selection process in which participants were given various tasks to perform to get shortlisted. Four contestants - Arun, Chopsey, Rahul, and Rashmeet, were shortlisted for the final battle to earn a chance on the Roadies' journey. They all entered in episode 20 where they battled in a gang task and individually for a spot in the journey.

Arun won the gang task and joined while Rahul was eliminated. Rashmeet won against Nikita in individual task to go on the journey while Chopsey lost against Aadil and was eliminated.

Journey - Munnar  Episode 9 to 15

First Task: Rescue Your Gangleader 
Before the task began, Gang Leaders had to vote to give a disadvantage to one of their opponents.

With two votes, Prince had the disadvantage of coming first in the task.

Roadies had to rescue their choice of Gang Leader; the first two to be free would win the task.

Second Task: Rasam Ki Rasam 
Before the task, the Real Heroes were allowed to choose their Gang. The two winners of the first task competed in this task.

Prince and Raftaar had to choose five roadies to compete in the Task, including their already existing Gang members.

Bhargsetu chose Raftaar, Milind chose Neha and Bidhan chose Prince as their Gang Leaders.

Raftaar won the task and got a chance to fill his gang. He chose Xerxes and Aarushi to join his team.

Third Task: Rollungi 
Before the task, the unsafe Roadies had to divide themselves into two teams.

One member from each gang would be in a cage and he/she had to roll the cage and break the pots inside. The balls would come out when the pots broke: another member would collect them and pass it to two of their team members who had tennis rackets in their hands.

They will try to hit the ball to the opponent's nets. Three boys would will be wearing lungi and protecting their nets from the other team's balls. The team that had hit more balls to the nets would win.

Team A won the task and were immune.

Fourth Task: Padhai Aur Pitaai 
Gang Leaders had to choose one roadie from the losing team in the Third task to compete in this task, including one of their already existing Gang members.

They had to solve some mathematical equations in which some hints were missing; those hints were in a pot. One of the members would go into the ring and break the pots held by skilled Kalaripayattu warriors who would be constantly moving sticks and be blindfolded.

They had to break those pots held by the Kalaripayattu artists and collect the missing objects to solve the equation. The team which solved the equations first would win.

Neha and Prince won the task in first and second place respectively.

As Neha won the task, she was allowed to choose one Roadie to join her gang - she chose Tara - and to send one Roadie into another gang of her choice. She chose Tarun and sent him to Sandeep's gang.

As Prince came in 2nd place in the task, he had the power to choose one Roadie into his gang. He chose Ankita.

Fifth Task: Hunt to Survive 
Before the task, the 12 unsafe Roadies had to divide themselves in three teams. They had to find some clues from the local market, to then solve the obstacles and collect flags. The team that collected two flags would win.

Team C won the task and were immune.

Sixth Task: Relay Jee Le 
All the gang leaders had to choose a team of four Roadies, including at least two from their existing gang (except Sandeep who only had Tarun in his gang).

Sandeep was out first, then Raftaar, and finally Neha. In the last round, Nikhil defeated Prince. Nikhil and Prince won the task and placed 1st and 2nd place respectively.

As Nikhil won the task, he received the power to complete his gang from the winners of the previous task (Team C). He chose Lakshya, Priya and Simran.

As Prince came in 2nd place in the task, he received the power to complete his gang from the remaining members of Team C and the unsafe roadies. He chose Gaurav and Yukti.

Following Preeti's removal, Sandeep and Neha had to fill their female roadie spots in their gangs. Sandeep chose Sahiba and Chetna; Neha was forced to pick Pooja.

After the removal of Krishna, gang leaders blocked Sohil to get into any gang as a power given to them, so Ashish went into Sandeep's gang.

Rannvijay played the joker card, declared Sohil as Joker and said that he would join them in the journey: not in any gang, but with him. He would join a random gang on a task as per the rule of that specific task.

Journey - Alleppey  Episode 16 to 19

Seventh Task: Ghayal Dummy 
Before the task began, Gang Leaders had to vote for one Gang Leader to not compete in this task.

With three votes, Nikhil did not get to compete in this task. But their group got to decide the order of performance of the gangs.

The dummy in each gang would automatically be immune.

Sohil, as Joker, got the chance to choose a gang to compete with. 

Gang Prince won the task and won immunity for the gang.

Eighth Task: Swiggy Three-Course Meal 
As Prince won immunity in the last task, they did not participate in this task. But they got to decide the order of performance of the Gangs.

Sandeep won the task and earned two immunities.

Ninth Task: Entertainment Task 
In this task, the gangs, along with their gang leaders, had to perform an act which had to include some special scenes. Divya Agrawal joined as the chief judge along with host Rannvijay. The joker had a choice to perform for any gang and he chose Raftaar's gang. Nikhil's gang performed first followed by Raftaar, Neha, Prince and Sandeep.

Raftaar won the task and won immunity for the whole team, including the Joker Sohil.

Tenth Task: Dingi Hopp 
In the task, one member from each gang had to perform this task. The Roadie had to collect all the flags from four dinghys which were be moving in the water in a speed boat. The Roadie had to jump from one dinghy to another and collect all the flags along with their carabiner. The team which collected more flags would win.

Before the start of the task, each gang leader had the power to deduct one flag from his/her team's collected flags.

Raftaar, being the winner of the last task, didn't perform in this task. Nikhil, with two disadvantages, lost two flags from his total while the rest had one flag deducted.

Gang Neha won the task and two immunities. Gang Prince came second and won one immunity.

Neha gave immunities to Milind and Tara while Prince gave immunity to Bidhan.

The unsafe Roadies voted out Pooja, while the safe Roadies voted out Tarun.

Tarun Solanki was replaced by the joker Sohil, who joined Sandeep's gang.

Journey - Wayanad  Episode 20 to 23

Eleventh Task: Battle Ground Final 
Rashmeet, Arun, Choupsey and Rahul entered as Battleground Finalists.

In this task, the Battleground Finalists had to choose one gang to take part. That Battleground Finalist and gang had to collect rice from the local houses at the expense of some objects provided to them. The gang that came first would get full gang immunity and the Battleground Finalist that came first will get a direct entry. The Battleground Finalists that come second and third would have to compete again, and the Battleground Finalist that came fourth would be eliminated.

Before the start of the task, each Battleground Finalist had to guess the price of a car from droom.in, and the closest guess would get an advantage.

Rashmeet guessed the closest and, as the advantage, she and her gang had to collect 5kg of rice. Arun & Chopsy guessed 2nd closest and had to collect 6 kg of rice each, and Rahul and his gang had to collect 7 kg of rice.

Arun won the task and got a direct entry into the Roadies Journey; Prince won full gang immunity, while Rahul came in fourth and was eliminated.

Rashmeet & Chopsy came second & third and had to challenge one non-immune Roadie.

Rashmeet won the task against Nikita and entered the Roadies Journey, while Aadil won the task and became immune; Choupsy was eliminated.

Twelfth Task: Puzzle Hustle 
In this task, the gangs had to pair up with another gang to perform the task. Neha paired up with Sandeep while Nikhil paired up with Raftaar.

In the task, the teams had to solve one puzzle whose parts were hanging above on ropes and in water. They had to collect them all and solve the puzzle in the water, while one of the opposing gang leaders had a bow and arrows to knock off the rival's puzzle.

Team Neha and Sandeep won the task and three immunities.

Neha gave immunity to Tara and Sandeep gave immunity to Sahiba and Ashish.

Based on their choice of preference, both Battleground winners were assigned to their gangs. Arun's first preference was Prince, but since it was full he went with his second preference, Raftaar. Rashmeet, as her first preference, chose Neha and joined them.

In the internal gang vote-out, Priya Singh, Chetna Joshi and Nikita Yadav were voted out.

Thirteenth Task: Pol kholo 
In this task, the gang leaders had to guess the answer to the question about the Roadies asked by Rannvijay. All the Roadies had three lifelines. If the gang leaders got the answer right he/she could take one lifeline of any two Roadies of other gang. If he/she gots the answer wrong then he/she had to take one lifeline of one Roadie from his/her gang. The Roadie whose lifeline stays available until the end of the task would be immune.

 Correct answer
 Wrong answer
 Advantage save
 All 3 lives lost

Roadies Auction 2.0 
The roadies who were immune in the last task go directly into the auction poll. The gang leaders can buy them using tamuls. Prince came 1st in the last task and received 180 tamuls, Sandeep received 160, Raftaar received 140, Neha received 120 and Nikhil received 100 tamuls to use as bid. The gang leader who bidded highest would take the Roadie but they could only take a maximum of two members from their previous team and were allowed no more than two boys or two girls in one gang.

 Won the bid
 Lost the bid
 Full Gang
 0 Tamuls

Journey - Madikeri  Episode 23 to 26

Fourteenth Task: Gayi Maths Paani Mein 
Rannvijay started the morning with a vote out where contestants had to nominate a Roadie from each gang. Adil from Nikhil, Arun from Raftaar and Sahiba from Sandeep were nominated. Prince's gang had full immunity. Milind from Neha used his real hero band to get immunity. The nominated contestants had to choose one member from their team to perform the task, where the contestants had to collect three boxes floating in water with the help of a local small boat called 'puttu'. Every box contains iron pipes with numbers written on them. Contestants had to bring the boxes to shore and arrange them to satisfy the equation hidden in another box. The team that completed this first would win immunity. Sahiba got one disadvantage from Prince; she had to bring four boxes.

Sahiba and Tara came first and won immunity for themselves.

Fifteenth Task: Treasure Rumble 
In this task, the Roadies had to collect plastic bottles from a dumpyard. Only two of the bottles contained a treasure map. Using the map, they had to dig and find the treasure. Then they had to protect the treasure from other team's Roadies because they could steal them. Milind and Lakshya got the treasure.

 Unsuccessful raid
 Successful raid

In the stealing process of the task, Gaurav was injured in his hand so the task was abandoned. Neha and Nikhil received two immunities and the other gangs received one.

Sohil, Milind, Lakshya, Simran, Arun, Ankita and Ashish received immunity.

Rashmeet Kaur was voted out due to a tie in the counter vote-off.

Sixteenth Task: Fight to Vote 
In this task, the gang leaders had to choose one girl and one boy Roadie from their gang, who would be imprisoned within a cage inside water. The nominated Roadies had to compete with each other to come out of the cage. When they came out, they could vote against one Roadie. The Roadie who came out the most of five times will got immunity and the Roadie who got the most votes would be voted out immediately.

Bidhan and Ankita won immunity by escaping the cage three times.

Aarushi Dutta and Rachel Gupta were eliminated in the battle.

Seventeenth Task: Do the Flip 
In this task, the gangs had to make alliances and perform. So Prince and Nikhil, and Neha and Raftaar made an alliance, leaving Sandeep out of this task.

In the task, one member had to climb two walls simultaneously and collect tickets. The second member had to go over a pathway of wooden stumps with only two wooden planks to move forward by placing it over two adjacent wooden stumps and collecting one ticket. The last member would be collecting cans with a magnet. The gang leader would be driving three vehicles one by one to cover the entire task area. There would be hourglasses with all the Roadies. Once the gang leader completed a round he/she could increase the time limit of one Roadie. The alliance that completed it first would receive two immunities. 

Alliance of Gang Neha and Gang Raftaar won and received two immunities: they were given to Milind and Arun.

Eighteenth Task: Gang Knockout Task 
Before this task, all the gang leaders had to name one gang whose whole gang they want to be knocked out. 

With a majority of votes, Sandeep was selected. They had one last chance to challenge one gang. If they won, they would stay and the other gang would be voted out. They decided to challenge Neha.

In this task, one Roadie had to roll over with an iron rod and collect the keys in the first box. Then they have to solve a puzzle and collect keys in the second box. Then they have to break one obstacle and collect the last keys. After that they have to arrange the parts of one picture which their gang leaders already know. This was a time based task.

Gang Sandeep knocked out Gang Neha. So Milind Chandwani and Sohil Singh were knocked out of the journey.

Journey - Chikkamagaluru  Episode 27 to 28

Nineteenth Task: Ticket to Finale 
In this task, one Roadie from each gang had to perform with their gang leaders. The Roadie had to shoot bottles with a catapult in a moving car and collect points in five minutes. If he/she completed the phase in time then he/she could collect more points by cutting wires. Then he/she had to climb against a wall and shoot flaming arrows to an assemblage of haystacks kept at different places and had to light them up. The more the roadie hits, the more points they will get. The haystacks which were not lit were not counted. More points will be given for that lit haystack that is nearer to the bottle, provided that bottle had been broken during the catapult run. Neha received the power to block one roadie to perform the task; she blocked Tara.

Both Bidhan and Lakshya got the same number of points but Bidhan won the task due to the times and received a place in the finale. Lakshya got a place in the semi final.

Ashish Bhatia was eliminated for finishing last in the task.

Gaurav Thukral was released from the show as his one hand was slightly fractured and he had no chance to participate in either the semi final or final.

Bidhan and Lakshya got immunity, Bhargsethu used her band to get immunity and Bidhan used his band for Ankita. Only Yukti, Arun and Tara were non-immune.

 

Tara Prasad was voted out and Sandeep was out of the game.

Semi-final

Twentieth Task: Finale Countdown 
Neha and Sandeep received a chance to select one Roadie and send them to fight against Arun and Lakshya; they chose Tara, so Tara re-entered to perform the semi-final task.

In this task all the ex-Roadies were invited. They had a chance to vote one Roadie to send him/her to the finale. The semi-finalists had to fight with each other and collect flags. Once they got two flags they could cancel a vote of another Roadie. 

Ankita won between the female Roadies while Arun won against the male Roadies and went to the finale.

Final 
In this task, the Roadies had to first climb a rope ladder and reach to the top of a car which would be uplifted by crane. Then they had to collect keys and send the car's number plate to Rannvijay. Then they had to open a box with a code given by Rannvijay and press a buzzer. Then they had to rescue their gang leader and climb a pole to rescue their previous gang members. Then all of them had to come to the finish line with their car.

Arun from Gang Raftaar won the task by completing it in 4m 10s. Whereas Ankita from Gang Prince completed it in 4m 53s and became the 1st runner up. Bidhan from Gang Prince completed it in 4m 55s and became the 2nd runner up.

Gangs

Finalists
Gang Raftaar:Arun Sharma - Winner

Gang Prince:1. Bidhaan Shrestha - 1st runner-up2. Ankita pathak- 2nd runner-up

Vote out order 

 Notes
 - The total votes were countered which resulted in a tie(1-1-1), but due to Rashmeet having received 10 votes as the majority, she was voted out. 
 - Both Aarushi and Rachel were voted out in the fight to vote task with only the Roadie who escaped the cage would vote.
 - Gang Neha was Knocked out by gang Sandeep.
 - Gaurav was released as heinjured his arm in a challenge prior.

Voting history 

 
The numbers 1, 2, 3, 4 and 5 in the chart represent the gangs in which the roadies were originally in before the auction (i.e, 1 - Prince, 2 - Nikhil, 3 - Neha, 4 - Raftaar & 5 - Sandeep).
 
 Indicates the contestant was immune that week.
 Indicates the contestant was in the danger that week.
 Indicates the contestant was eliminated that week.
 Indicates the contestant wild card entry in the competition.
 Indicates the contestant was eliminated outside vote out that week.
 Real Heroes used their hero immunity.
 Indicates the contestant is the runner up.
 Indicates the contestant won the competition.
 
 Note
 - Instead of Raftaar, his gang was given the power to save any of the roadies in danger and eliminate the votes against him/her, they chose Pooja. So all the votes against her were not counted. 
 - The gang leaders except Sandeep voted to block one of the non-immune boys from joining his gang. 
 - Neha's vote to block Krishna did not count as he was already Voted-out. 
 - Sohil being the only contestant remained without a gang, became the Joker, where he would play on any of the gang leader team until he earned his place in a gang or was voted out. It was in episode 19 where he replaced Tarun to join Sandeep gang. 
 - There were 2 rounds of vote-out, first the non-immune roadies voted to vote-out a roadie and in the second round the immune roadies did the same but as a replacement for the joker.
 - Bhargsethu was unwell so she was absent from that vote-out session. 
 - This was a triple internal gang vote-out, the non-immnue roadies nominated a person from within the gang to be voted-out. And then the immune gang had the power to save 1 person from being voted out. 
 - This was a Gang Vs Gang vote-out, where the gang members would vote for a person from each gang. The roadies in danger battled each other to avoid elimination. 
 - Real heroes used their hero immunity, while Bidhan used it to save Ankita. 
 - Gang Sandeep being in danger challenged Gang Neha in sudden death to avoid from being knocked out of the game.

References 

MTV Roadies
2019 Indian television seasons